Dursupe Manor is a manor house located in the , Balgale Parish, Talsi Municipality, in the historical region of Courland, western Latvia.

History 
The manor house was built in 1820 and was reconstructed in the second half of the 19th century in Neoclassical style.The manor complex also includes several granaries, a servant's house, a lime tree, a fork and a 6.7-hectare park with split beech.

At the beginning of the 19th century, it was owned by Prince Karl Christoph  Lieven (1767-1844), the Russian Minister of Education (1828-1833), the founder of the Teacher Training Seminary. K. K. Liven is buried at Balgale Church.

See also
List of palaces and manor houses in Latvia

References

Manor houses in Latvia
Talsi Municipality